Speier is a surname. Notable people with the surname include:

Chris Speier (born 1950), baseball player and coach
Gabe Speier (born 1995), American baseball player
Hermine Speier (1898-1989), German archaeologist 
Jackie Speier (born 1950), Democratic congresswoman from California
Justin Speier (born 1973), baseball player
Ryan Speier (born 1979), baseball player

See also 
Speyer, city in Germany